Sir Charles James Martin  (9 January 1866 – 15 February 1955) was a British scientist who did seminal work on a very wide range of topics including snake toxins, control of body temperature, plague and the way it was spread, dysentery, typhoid and paratyphoid, nutrition and vitamin deficiencies, proteins, and myxomatosis as a means of controlling rabbit populations. He was a director of the Lister Institute of Preventive Medicine, serving from 1903 to 1930.

Early life
Born in Wilmot House, Dalston, Hackney, North London he was the twelfth child of Josiah (an insurance company actuary) and Elizabeth Mary Martin (née Lewis), Charles James was part of an extended family of children from his parents' previous marriages. Being a delicate child, he was sent off to a private boarding school in Hastings.

At 15 he was employed as a junior clerk at the insurance firm where his father worked. He studied mathematics as a requirement for a future as actuary, but showed no special aptitude. Browsing through the numerous bookshops in the area, he came across a secondhand copy of "A Hundred Experiments in Chemistry for One Shilling." Carrying out these experiments, he was sufficiently inspired to entreat his father to allow him to pursue a career in science. He accordingly took evening classes at King's College, London. He then studied medicine at St Thomas's Hospital and spent some time in Leipzig studying physiology under Karl Ludwig.

Career

In 1891 he accepted a post as lecturer at Sydney University, before moving to the University of Melbourne as acting Professor of Physiology. He remained in Australia for 12 years, after which he returned to the UK to become the first Director of the Lister Institute of Preventive Medicine.

He was elected a Fellow of the Royal Society in 1901. His candidacy citation read: 

During World War I he served with the Australian Army Medical Corps in Gallipoli, Egypt, and France as a pathologist with the rank of Lieutenant-colonel. He found some cases of enteric fever at Gallipoli were not typhoid, but paratyphoids A and B, and made a vaccine for all three. A memo to his colleagues on the different treatments for amoebic and bacillary dysentery was widely circulated by the army under Martin’s name. In France he organized the integration of decentralized pathology services into the A.A.M.C. After the war he returned to the Lister Institute until his retirement in 1930. He then spent a further two years in Australia as head of the animal nutrition division of the Council of Scientific and Industrial Research in Adelaide. On his return to the UK he went to live at Roebuck House in Old Chesterton, Cambridge, which he equipped as a laboratory. During WWII it was used to rehouse the experimental animals being used for medical studies by the staff of the Lister Institute. In 1934 he undertook an experimental study of the myxoma virus, at Cambridge and on a rabbit-infested island in Pembrokeshire, to show it was both safe and effective to control plagues of rabbits. 

He was awarded the Royal Society's Royal Medal in 1923 and delivered the Royal College of Physicians Croonian Lectures in 1930. He was knighted in 1927.

His contributions to the foundation of biological science in Australia were commemorated by the National Health and Medical Research Council, which created the Sir Charles James Martin Overseas Biomedical Fellowships in 1951.

Personal life
He died in 1955 at Old Chesterton. He had married Edith Cross, born 24 February 1860, died 2 March 1954, daughter of Alfred Cross in 1891. They had one daughter. He is buried in the Parish of the Ascension Burial Ground in Cambridge, with his wife.

References

External links
 

British scientists
1866 births
1955 deaths
People from Hackney Central
Alumni of King's College London
Fellows of King's College London
Academics of King's College London
Royal Medal winners
Alumni of Birkbeck, University of London
Fellows of the Royal Society
Fellows of the Royal College of Physicians
Knights Bachelor
Companions of the Order of St Michael and St George
People from Chesterton, Cambridge
People from Dalston